Joanna Clark (1978 - 4 August 2022) was professor of environmental science at the University of Reading. She worked on aspects of carbon and water cycles in terrestrial and freshwater ecosystems from test-tube to catchment scale. She is founder and was director of the Loddon Observatory, which aims to bring together academia, charities, public sector and business to support sustainable societies.

Education and research career 
Clark completed a BSc in geography at the University of Durham in 1999, followed by an MSc in monitoring, modelling and management of environmental change at King's College London in 2000. She completed a PhD in physical geography at the University of Leeds in 2005, before undertaking postdoctoral research associate positions at Leeds, Bangor and Imperial College London. She moved to the University of Reading in 2010.

Carbon and water cycle research 
Clark's research is focussed on understanding the interactions between water, carbon and other biogeochemical cycles within terrestrial and freshwater ecosystems. She has specific interests in peatland biogeochemistry. Clark uses lab simulation experiments, field monitoring, modelling and remote sensing. Her work on natural flood management uses natural land-based measures to reduce the risk of flooding for communities. Clark's work with the water sector has addressed issues relating to continued supply of clean water in face of growing population, ageing infrastructure and the impacts of climate change. Clark has also promoted the use of agroforestry for removal of greenhouse gases from the atmosphere.

Recognition and service 
Editor for PeerJ

Member of the editorial board for Scientific Reports

References 

1978 births
2022 deaths
Environmental scientists
Alumni of Durham University
Alumni of King's College London
Alumni of the University of Leeds
Academics of the University of Reading